Slavic Americans are Americans of Slavic descent.

East Slavic Americans
  Belarusian Americans
  Russian Americans
  Rusyn Americans
  Ukrainian Americans

South Slavic Americans
  Bosnian Americans
  Bulgarian Americans
  Croatian Americans
  Macedonian Americans
  Montenegrin Americans
  Serbian Americans
  Slovene Americans
  Yugoslav Americans

West Slavic Americans
  Czech Americans
  Kashubian Americans
  Polish Americans
  Silesian Americans 
  Slovak Americans
  Sorbian Americans

Communities with large Slavic population ranked by percentage

Bulgarian   
Bowdon, Georgia 2.7%
Rosemont, Illinois 3.7%
Point Reyes Station, California 2.3%
Crozet, Virginia 2.1%
Schiller Park, Illinois 1.8%

Croatian   
Bessemer, Pennsylvania 9.5%
Ellsworth, Pennsylvania 7.1%
Empire, Louisiana 6.8%
Versailles, Pennsylvania 6.7%
Braddock Hills, Pennsylvania 5.8%

Czech  
Conway, North Dakota 55.2%
Munden, Kansas 46.8%
West, Texas 40.9%
Oak Creek Township, Nebraska 38.2%
Wilber, Nebraska 37.3%

Russian   
Nikolaevsk, Alaska 67.5%
Pikesville, Maryland 19.30%
Roslyn Estates, New York 18.60%
Hewlett Harbor, New York 18.40%

Polish      
Pulawski Township, Michigan 65.7%
Posen Township, Michigan  65.4%
Posen, Michigan 56.1%
Sharon, Wisconsin 53.7%
Bevent, Wisconsin 52.7%
Sloan, New York 46.8%

Serbian  
Export, Pennsylvania 6.2%
Midland, Pennsylvania 5.8%
Industry, Pennsylvania 4.5%
Ohioville, Pennsylvania 3.7%
Wilmerding, Pennsylvania 3.7%

Ukrainian  
Delta Junction, Alaska 16.40%
Cass Township, Pennsylvania 14.30%
Belfield, North Dakota 13.60%
Gulich Township, Pennsylvania 12.70%
Gilberton, Pennsylvania 12.40%
Wilton, North Dakota 10.30%

Education and income

References

Further reading
 Bicha, Karel D. "Hunkies: Stereotyping the Slavic Immigrants, 1890-1920." Journal of American Ethnic History 2.1 (1982): 16-38.  online
 Elliott, Robin G. "The Eastern European Immigrant in American Literature: The View of the Host Culture, 1900-1930." Polish American Studies (1985): 25-45. online
 Jones, J. Sydney. "Polish Americans." Gale Encyclopedia of Multicultural America, edited by Thomas Riggs, (3rd ed., vol. 3, Gale, 2014), pp. 477-492. online
 Kralj, Dejan. "Balkan minds: Transnational nationalism & the transformation of South Slavic immigrant identity in Chicago, 1890–1941" (PhD Dissertation, Loyola University Chicago, 2012.) online
 Steidl, Annemarie et al. From a Multiethnic Empire to a Nation of Nations: Austro-Hungarian Migrants in the US, 1870–1940 (Innsbruck: Studien Verlag, 2017). 354 pp. 
 Thernstrom, Stephan; Orlov, Ann; Handlin, Oscar, eds. Harvard Encyclopedia of American Ethnic Groups, Harvard University Press, (1980), the standard reference, covering all major groups and most minor groups online

External links
Slavic American National Convention
Slavic-American Chamber of Commerce

 
Eastern Europeans in the United States